A Member of Parliament in the Lok Sabha (abbreviated: MP) is the representative of a legislative constituency in the Lok Sabha; the lower house of the Parliament of India. Members of parliament of Lok Sabha are chosen by direct elections on the basis of the adult suffrage. The maximum permitted strength of members of parliament in the Lok Sabha is 550. This includes the maximum 530 members to represent the constituencies and states and up to 20 members to represent the union territories (both chosen by direct elections). Between 1952 and 2020, two seats were reserved for members of the Anglo-Indian community. The current elected strength of the Lok Sabha is 543. The party—or coalition of parties—having a majority in the Lok Sabha chooses the Prime Minister of India.

History
The first instance of member of parliament equivalent in India dates back to 9 December 1946, the day Constituent Assembly of India was formed with the purpose of drafting a constitution for India. As opposed to be elected on the basis of adult suffrage, the Constituent Assembly of India consisted of indirectly elected representatives and were not categorised between Rajya Sabha and Lok Sabha. Muslims and Sikhs were given special representation as minorities. The Constituent Assembly of India took 2 years, 11 months and 18 days to draft the constitution for independent India and was dissolved in 1949.

On 26 January 1950, the Indian constitution came into force and the first general elections (under the new constitution) were held in 1951–1952. The 1st Lok Sabha was constituted on 17 April 1952 and had 489 constituencies, thereby first set of elected members of parliament of Lok Sabha in India.

Eligibility criteria
A person must satisfy all following conditions to be qualified to become a member of parliament of the Lok Sabha; 
 Must be a citizen of India.
 Must not be less than 25 years of age.
 Must be a sound person
 Must not be convicted by the court with imprisonment of two Or more years
 Must be a voter for any parliamentary constituency in India.
 Candidate of a recognised political party needs one proposer from his/her constituency for his/her nomination. 
 An independent candidate needs ten proposers.

Disqualification grounds
A person would be ineligible for being a Member of the Lok Sabha if the person;
 Holds any office of profit under the Government of India (other than an office permitted by Parliament of India by law).
 Is of unsound mind.
 Is an insolvent.
 Has ceased to be a citizen of India.
 Is so disqualified by any law made by the Indian parliament.
 Is so disqualified on the ground of defection.
 Has been convicted, among other things, for promoting enmity between different groups.
 Has been convicted for offence of bribery.
 Has been punished for preaching and practising social crimes such as untouchability, dowry, or sati.
 Has been convicted for an offence and sentenced to imprisonment of more than two years.
 Has been dismissed for corruption or for disloyalty to the state (in case of a government servant).

Term
The term of a member of parliament of Lok Sabha (dissolved) is five years from the date appointment for its first meeting. During a state of emergency, the term however can be extended by the Parliament of India by law for a period not exceeding one year at a time. After the state of emergency ends, the extension cannot exceed beyond a period of six months.

Responsibilities of members of parliament
Broad responsibilities of the members of parliament of Lok Sabha are; 
 Legislative responsibility: To pass Laws of India in the Lok Sabha.
 Oversight responsibility: To ensure that the executive (i.e. government) performs its duties satisfactorily. 
Representative responsibility: To represent the views and aspirations of the people of their constituency in the Parliament of India (Lok Sabha).
 Power of the purse responsibility: To approve and oversee the revenues and expenditures proposed by the government. 
 The Union Council of Ministers, who are also members of parliament have an additional responsibility of the executive as compared to those who are not in the Council of Ministers.

Salary, allowances and entitlements
The Salary, allowances and pension of Member of the Lok Sabha is governed by the Members of Parliament Act, 1954. The act is in pursuance to the constitutional provisions where article 106 of the Constitution of India provides that the members of either House of Parliament shall be entitled to receive such salaries and allowances as may from time to time be determined by Parliament by law.

The rules governing salaries, allowances and facilities such as medical, housing, telephone facilities, daily allowance etc... is looked after by a joint committee of both the houses (Lok Sabha and the Rajya Sabha). The committee is constituted from time to time after consultation with the Government of India.

Strength

Article 81 of the Constitution of India 1949 has specified maximum strength of members of parliament in the Lok Sabha to be 552. The number of members of parliament is distributed among the States in such a way that the ratio between the number of seats allotted to each State and the population of the State is, so far as practicable, the same for all States. Out of the maximum permitted strength, 
Not more than 530 members to be chosen by direct election from territorial constituencies in the Indian states.
Not more than 20 members to represent the union territories, chosen in such manner as Parliament of India may by law provide.
Total permitted maximum strength of 550 members.

Members of the Lok Sabha

Members of the lower house of the Indian Parliament (Lok Sabha) were elected in the Indian general election, 2019 held in April–May 2019. The total strength of the 17th Lok Sabha is 544, against the then-approved strength of 552.

Number of constituencies: 1951–2019
The following is a list of the number of constituencies in the Lok Sabha in each election year, beginning in 1951. The numbers do not include two seats from the Anglo-Indian community, to which individuals were nominated by the President of India.

Anglo-Indian reservation

In January 2020, the Anglo-Indian reserved seats in the Parliament and State Legislatures of India was discontinued by the 126th Constitutional Amendment Bill of 2019, when enacted as 104th Constitutional Amendment Act, 2019. As a result the maximum permitted strength of the Lok Sabha was reduced from 552 to 550.

See also
List of members of the 17th Lok Sabha
 Constitution of India
 Parliament of India

References 

Lok Sabha